Christine Ebersole (born February 21, 1953) is an American actress and singer. She has appeared in film, television, and on stage. She starred in the Broadway musicals 42nd Street and Grey Gardens, winning two Tony Awards. She has co-starred on the TBS sitcom Sullivan & Son, in which she played Carol Walsh, and earned an Emmy Award nomination for her work in One Life to Live. She is also known for her recurring roles as Ms. Newberg on Royal Pains and White Diamond in the Steven Universe franchise. Since 2019, she has played the role of Dottie on Bob Hearts Abishola.

Early life
Ebersole was born in Winnetka, Illinois, the daughter of Marian Esther (née Goodley) and Robert "Bob" Ebersole. Her father was the president of a steel company in Milwaukee, Wisconsin. She has Swiss-German and Irish ancestry. Ebersole graduated from New Trier High School in 1971. She attended MacMurray College in Jacksonville, Illinois, class of 1975, and the American Academy of Dramatic Arts.

Career
She met Marc Shaiman when he was 19 and the musical director of her first club act. She appeared in two different parts on Ryan's Hope in 1977 (as a nurse) and 1980 (as Lily Darnell), and was a cast member of Saturday Night Live during 1981–82, the first full season under new producer Dick Ebersol (their similar surnames being a coincidence), acting as "Weekend Update" co-anchor with Brian Doyle-Murray and at times impersonating Mary Travers, Cheryl Tiegs, Barbara Mandrell, Diana, Princess of Wales, and Rona Barrett. Following SNL, she appeared in One Life to Live as daffy Maxie McDermott (receiving an Emmy nomination) and Valerie. She co-starred with Barnard Hughes on the sitcom The Cavanaughs, played the title role in the short-lived sitcom Rachel Gunn, R.N., and guest-starred on Will & Grace, Dolly!, Just Shoot Me, Murphy Brown, Ally McBeal, Samantha Who, Boston Legal, The Colbert Report, and Royal Pains. In 1991, she appeared as the titular Miss Jones in a pilot for an ABC series about a single mother, but the series was not taken up.

She appeared in the 1993 television movie adaptation of Gypsy starring Bette Midler, and in the 2000 ABC-TV movie Mary and Rhoda starring Mary Tyler Moore and Valerie Harper.

In 2011, she had a recurring role on the TV Land sitcom Retired at 35. In 2014, she played Carol Walsh on the TBS sitcom Sullivan & Son. She has a recurring role on the USA Network television show Royal Pains as Ms. Newberg.

Ebersole's films have included Tootsie (1982), Amadeus (1984), Three Men and a Baby (1987), Mac and Me (1988), My Girl 2 (1994), Richie Rich (1994), Black Sheep (1996), and My Favorite Martian (1999).

Ebersole has found considerable success on stage. She appeared in Going Hollywood, a musical by David Zippel and Jeremy Shaeffer. She was in the chorus in 1983 with Jerry Mitchell. They were both excited about the possibility of going to Broadway but never made it. She was featured in Paper Moon by Larry Grossman and Ellen Fitzhugh and Carol Hall, which ran at the Paper Mill Playhouse (Millburn, New Jersey) in September 1993. Off-Broadway, she has appeared in Three Sisters and Talking Heads, and her Broadway credits include On the Twentieth Century, the 1979 revival of Oklahoma! (as Ado Annie), the 1980 revival of Camelot and the 2000 revival of Gore Vidal's The Best Man.

In 2001, she appeared in the Broadway revival of 42nd Street as Dorothy Brock, for which she won her first Tony Award for Best Leading Actress in a Musical, She next appeared in the 2002 Broadway revival of Dinner at Eight as Millicent Jordan for which she was nominated for the Tony Award, Featured Actress in a Play. In 2005 she played M'Lynn in the Broadway production of Steel Magnolias.

In 2006, Ebersole took the dual roles of Edith Ewing Bouvier Beale ("Big Edie") and Edith Bouvier Beale ("Little Edie") in Grey Gardens, a musical based upon the film of the same name. After a sold-out off-Broadway run, Ebersole remained with the roles when the production moved to Broadway in November 2006, and remained with the show through its closing in July 2007. For this role, she won her second Tony Award for Best Leading Actress in a Musical. She appeared as Elvira in the 2009 Broadway revival of the Noël Coward comedy Blithe Spirit.

She appeared in the new musical War Paint, which premiered at the Goodman Theatre in Chicago on June 28, 2016, for a run through August 2016. The show began previews at the Nederlander Theatre on Broadway on March 7, 2017, and opened on April 6, 2017. It closed on November 5, 2017. She played the role of Elizabeth Arden, opposite Patti LuPone as Helena Rubinstein. The musical had a book by Doug Wright with the music composed by Scott Frankel (music) and Michael Korie (lyrics).

Concerts
Ebersole appears in concerts and cabaret engagements at venues such as the Cinegrill and Cafe Carlyle. She won the 2010 Nightlife Award for Outstanding Cabaret Vocalist in a Major Engagement for her 2009 Café Carlyle cabaret. In 2009 she performed with Michael Feinstein at his club, Feinstein's at Loews Regency, (New York City) in a cabaret titled "Good Friends". She was one of the performers on the Playbill Cruise in September 2011. In November 2011, she performed for two sold-out nights at Birdland in New York City with jazz violinist Aaron Weinstein and his trio.

In 2015, Ebersole toured her show Big Noise from Winnetka, which included the 1938 jazz song Big Noise from Winnetka and a stop in Illinois.

Recording
She also has appeared on several albums. She was featured on the Bright Lights, Big City concept album. She also released an album of Noël Coward songs after browsing through them for scene change music for Blithe Spirit. She is also the voice actress for White Diamond on the popular show Steven Universe.

In 2012, Christine Ebersole appeared on InfoWars' The Alex Jones Show, expressing her misgivings about the Federal Reserve System and the Council on Foreign Relations.

Personal life
Ebersole has been married twice, to actor Peter Bergman from 1976 through 1981, and since 1988 to Bill Moloney, with whom she has adopted three children. She lives in Maplewood, New Jersey, with her family.

Filmography

Film

Television

Theatre

References

External links

Production: Grey Gardens Working in the Theatre by the American Theatre Wing, November 2006
Performance Working in the Theatre video from the American Theatre Wing, September 2001
Star File: Christine Ebersole at Broadway.com
Interview with Christine Ebersole, TonyAwards.com 
interview with Christine Ebersole, BroadwayWorld.com, August 16, 2007

1953 births
Actresses from Chicago
American Academy of Dramatic Arts alumni
American film actresses
American musical theatre actresses
American soap opera actresses
American stage actresses
American television actresses
American people of Swiss-German descent
American people of Irish descent
Living people
New Trier High School alumni
Obie Award recipients
People from Maplewood, New Jersey
People from Winnetka, Illinois
Tony Award winners
Drama Desk Award winners
MacMurray College alumni
20th-century American actresses
21st-century American actresses
American sketch comedians
Comedians from Illinois
20th-century American comedians
21st-century American comedians